The 1987-88 Welsh Cup winners were Cardiff City. The final was played at the Vetch Field in Swansea in front of an attendance of 5,465.

Semi-finals – first leg

Semi-finals – second leg

Final

External links
Details of final

1987-88
Wales
Cup